Carleton Stone is a Canadian singer-songwriter based in Cape Breton, Nova Scotia. After recording three albums as a solo artist, Stone joined forces in 2015 with musicians Dylan Guthro and Breagh Mackinnon to form the pop band Port Cities.

Life and career

Stone was born in Sydney, Nova Scotia. He had a musical family and grew up listening to Bruce Springsteen, Ryan Adams, and Bob Dylan, among others.

He began his professional musical life fronting a band, and self-produced the group's debut album, entitled Carleton Stone Drives the Big Wheel, which was released in 2009. In 2011, he became a solo artist, releasing the eponymous Carleton Stone, produced by Hawksley Workman.

Stone's third album, Draws Blood, was co-produced by Jason Collett, of Broken Social Scene, and Howie Beck. It was released in 2014 and was dedicated to his friend and mentor Jay Smith, a well-known Canadian musician, who took his own life in 2013 after struggling with addiction and depression.

In 2015, Stone joined fellow singer-songwriters Dylan Guthro and Breagh Mackinnon to form the band Port Cities. Port Cities makes singer/songwriter-style pop music and takes advantage of all three voices with extensive use of vocal harmonies.

"We just thought, there's such a great chemistry between us, why not try to join forces and do something that's bigger that any of us could do on our own?" said Stone in 2015. In 2016, the band was signed to turtlemusik/Warner Music. Their debut album was released in 2017.

In 2022, Stone began releasing singles from his forthcoming fourth solo album, Papercut. His first single, "Ice Age" was inspired by a story he had heard on CBC's interview show As It Happens.

Discography

Albums

Singles

Producer credits

Songwriting credits (co-songwriter)

Awards and achievements
With Port Cities (band)

As Carleton Stone

References

External links
 
 Carleton Stone on Spotify

Living people
Canadian pop singers
Canadian male singers
Canadian singer-songwriters
Musicians from Nova Scotia
Year of birth missing (living people)
Canadian male singer-songwriters